Sony's Spider-Man Universe (SSU) is an American media franchise and shared universe centered on a series of superhero films produced by Columbia Pictures in association with Marvel Entertainment. Distributed by Sony Pictures Releasing, the films are based on various Marvel Comics characters and properties commonly associated with Spider-Man.

Work on an expanded universe using supporting characters from the Spider-Man films began by December 2013. Sony Pictures planned to use The Amazing Spider-Man 2 (2014) to launch several spin-off films focused on Spider-Man villains from the comics, including a Venom film. After the relative critical and financial disappointment of The Amazing Spider-Man 2, these plans were abandoned and in February 2015, Sony announced a deal to collaborate with Marvel Studios on future Spider-Man films and integrate the character into the Marvel Cinematic Universe (MCU). This relationship produced Spider-Man: Homecoming (2017), Spider-Man: Far From Home (2019), and Spider-Man: No Way Home (2021), while Sony separately redeveloped Venom (2018) as a stand-alone film later established as beginning its own fictional universe. Sony and Marvel Studios renegotiated their deal in 2019 to share the Spider-Man character between the MCU and their standalone Marvel-based films. Venom was followed by Venom: Let There Be Carnage (2021) and Morbius (2022), both of which have mid-credit scenes that feature elements from the multiverse concept to link the SSU with the MCU. Venom and Morbius received negative reviews from critics while Venom: Let There Be Carnage received mixed reviews. The series has grossed a combined $1.5 billion worldwide.

Sony is developing a number of live-action films based on Marvel characters, with scheduled releases for Kraven the Hunter in 2023, and El Muerto and Madame Web in 2024. Several more films are in various stages of development, and Sony Pictures Television is developing several live-action television series set in the same shared universe, which include Silk: Spider Society and an untitled Spider-Man Noir series.

Name 
Sony officially announced their new shared universe—based on various Marvel Comics properties and characters commonly associated with Spider-Man—in May 2017, with the title "Sony's Marvel Universe". By August 2018, it was being referred to as "Sony's Universe of Marvel Characters" internally at the company. In March 2019, a Sony Pictures Entertainment presentation referred to the "Sony Pictures Universe of Marvel Characters" (SPUMC), and Sony later confirmed that this was the official name for its shared universe. The presentation applied the title to Marvel Studios' Spider-Man films and the animated Spider-Verse films as well as Sony's own live-action Marvel adaptations. The title was widely criticized, with commentators mocking its length compared to shorter franchise names like the Marvel Cinematic Universe (MCU) and DC Extended Universe (DCEU), as well as the acronym "SPUMC". James Whitbrook of io9 questioned why the term "Spider-Verse" was not being used. Columbia Pictures president Sanford Panitch stated that Sony did not want to refer to their shared universe as the "Spider-Verse" since it encompassed many characters separate from Spider-Man. Despite this, Sony announced in August 2021 that the franchise had been renamed "Sony's Spider-Man Universe" (SSU).

Development

Background 
In January 2010, Sony announced that the Spider-Man film franchise would be rebooted after director Sam Raimi decided to no longer continue his version of the franchise. By March 2012, Sony was still interested in a spin-off film they had been developing centered on the character Venom, looking to capitalize on the release of the first reboot film, The Amazing Spider-Man (2012). That June, producers Avi Arad and Matt Tolmach discussed Venom and The Amazing Spider-Man in reference to the Marvel Cinematic Universe and how the different franchises set in that world crossed over with The Avengers (2012). Tolmach stated, "Hopefully all these worlds will live together in peace someday." In December 2013, Sony revealed plans to use The Amazing Spider-Man 2 (2014) to establish their own expanded universe based on the Marvel properties the studio had the film rights to, including Venom. Arad and Tolmach would produce the films as part of a franchise brain trust that also included Alex Kurtzman, Roberto Orci, Jeff Pinkner, Ed Solomon, and Drew Goddard, and The Amazing Spider-Man and The Amazing Spider-Man 2 director Marc Webb. However, after The Amazing Spider-Man 2 underperformed and with Sony "under tremendous pressure to perform", the direction of the new shared universe was rethought.

Following the November 2014 hacking of Sony's computers, emails between Sony Pictures Entertainment Co-chairman Amy Pascal and president Doug Belgrad were released, stating that Sony was planning to "rejuvenate" the Spider-Man franchise by developing an animated comedy film with Phil Lord and Christopher Miller. Sony executives were set to discuss the project further in a discussion regarding several Spider-Man spin-off films at a summit in January 2015. In February 2015, Sony and Marvel Studios announced a new partnership that would see the latter produce the next Spider-Man film for Sony, and integrate the character into the MCU. Sony still planned to produce the spin-off films without Marvel's involvement, but these were believed to have been "scrapped" by November, with Sony instead focusing on its new reboot with Marvel. Discussing the animated film during that year, Sony Pictures chairman Tom Rothman said it would "co-exist" with the live-action Spider-Man films, though Sony stated it would "exist independently of the projects in the live-action Spider-Man universe". The animated film Spider-Man: Into the Spider-Verse (2018) is set in an alternate universe from the Marvel Spider-Man reboot, but introduces the comic-based concept of the "Spider-Verse" multiverse, in which different incarnations of Spider-Man can be brought together; Sony was excited by the possibility of crossovers between the live-action and animated films after seeing the quality of Into the Spider-Verse.

Sony's shared universe 
Venom was revived by Sony in March 2016, envisioned as a standalone film unrelated from Sony and Marvel's new Spider-Man films, which would launch its own franchise and shared universe. In May 2017, Sony confirmed that Venom was not considered a spin-off of any other film, and would officially begin its own shared universe. Sony was looking to build out this new universe gradually rather than rush in as they had previously tried with the Amazing Spider-Man spin-offs. In July, Columbia Pictures president Sanford Panitch explained that they were looking to "do what's the absolute best for each individual property. I just want to honor the original DNA." Because of this, Sony was hoping that individual filmmakers would give each film its own distinct style rather than having a single person in charge of the universe as with the MCU's Kevin Feige. The studio also wanted to avoid "conventional comic-book movies", with the intention of dealing in different genres such as horror or comedy, potential R-ratings, and even lower-than-usual budgets, depending on each project.

By March 2018, Sony's executive vice president Palak Patel was overseeing all of the universe's films for the studio. In July, Vulture interviewed several creatives involved in the universe to try alleviate the fears of some fans concerning Sony's plans. Jonathan Goldstein—writer of the first MCU Spider-Man film, Spider-Man: Homecoming (2017)—said the future of the universe would be decided by the success of Venom, and noted that other studios had struggled to replicate Marvel Studios' MCU success. Brian Michael Bendis, comic creator of many Marvel characters that Sony planned to add to its universe, consulted on Into the Spider-Verse and was aware of Sony's plans for its shared universe. He described them as "very cool. Fans wouldn't be annoyed with what they're doing." He added that MCU films such as Iron Man (2008) and Guardians of the Galaxy (2014), which he was also involved in, were considered risks due to the lack of familiarity that general audiences had with those properties, but they both went on to be successful. He said this could also happen to lesser-known Spider-Man characters. In August, Sony was confirmed to have the rights to 900 Marvel Comics characters, and Panitch explained that "Spider-Man connects to a lot of the characters. There are villains, heroes, and antiheroes, and a lot are female characters, many of whom are bona fide, fully dimensionalized, and utterly unique. We feel there's no reason the Marvel characters shouldn't be able to embrace diversity." When asked whether Venom would act as the "common thread" throughout the shared universe, Sony said this was not necessarily the case as they wanted Venom to be standalone, but said Venom would have "key points of intersection" with other films.

Following the successful release of Venom, Pascal said some of Sony's "previously shelved plans" could now come to fruition, including a crossover based on the villainous Sinister Six team. In March 2019, Sony Pictures Entertainment chairman Tony Vinciquerra said the "next seven or eight years" of the shared universe had been planned.

Marvel Cinematic Universe connections 
Feige stated in June 2017 that because Venom was solely a Sony project, Marvel Studios had no plans to have it crossover with the MCU. However, producer Amy Pascal soon clarified that Sony intended to have their new Marvel-based films take place in "the same world" as Spider-Man: Homecoming, describing them as "adjunct" to that world. She said that Venom would have connections with the next planned film in Sony's shared universe, Silver & Black, and that there was potential for Tom Holland's Spider-Man to crossover from the MCU films to the films in Sony's universe. Holland was not contracted to appear outside of a trilogy of Spider-Man films and several other MCU films, but Sony intended to have the actor appear in their other Marvel films eventually. According to several reports, Holland spent several days during Venom production filming a cameo appearance as Peter Parker / Spider-Man for the film, but Marvel Studios asked Sony to exclude the scene from the final film. By August 2018, Sony was actively planning to crossover Spider-Man with their own Marvel films, describing the character and Venom as "already in the same universe... we are looking forward to the two of them eventually facing off in the future". Sony was also open to more of their characters appearing in MCU films in exchange for more MCU characters appearing in their own films. In December, Venom writer Jeff Pinkner was asked if that film was set in the same universe as Holland's Spider-Man films, and he said, "without revealing anything that I'm not allowed to reveal, it is not impossible that in a future/upcoming Venom movie, Spider-Man will play a significant role". Pascal added, in reference to a crossover between the MCU Spider-Man films, Sony's own shared universe films, and Sony's animated Spider-Verse films, that "there's a world in which everything comes together", but Holland was restricted by his contract with Marvel Studios at that time.

By August 2019, Marvel Studios and the Walt Disney Company had spent several months discussing expanding their deal with Sony, with the latter looking to include more films than were originally agreed upon while keeping the same terms of the original agreement. Disney expressed concern with Feige's workload producing the non-Spider-Man MCU films already, and asked for a 25–50% stake in any future films Feige produces for Sony. Unable to come to an agreement, Sony announced that it would be moving forward on the next Spider-Man film without Feige or Marvel. They acknowledged that this could change in the future, thanked Feige for his work on Homecoming and Spider-Man: Far From Home (2019), and stated that they appreciated "the path [Feige] has helped put us on, which we will continue." The Hollywood Reporter added that the end of the studios' agreement "almost certainly" meant that Holland's Spider-Man would no longer appear in MCU films, but "significantly increased" the chances of the character crossing over with the rest of Sony's own Marvel films such as the Venom franchise and the then-in-production Morbius (2022). In September, Vinciquerra stated that "for the moment the door is closed" on Spider-Man returning to the MCU, and confirmed that the character would be integrated with Sony's own shared universe moving forward, saying "he will play off the other characters" that the studio owns the rights to. In response to backlash from fans following the announcement, Vinciquerra added that "the Marvel people are terrific people, we have great respect for them, but on the other hand we have some pretty terrific people of our own. Kevin didn't do all the work... we're pretty capable of doing what we have to do here."

Following a negative fan reaction at Disney's biennial D23 Expo, and at the urging of Holland who personally spoke to Rothman and Disney CEO Bob Iger, Disney returned to negotiations with Sony. Later that September, Sony and Disney announced a new agreement that would allow Marvel Studios and Feige to produce a third MCU Spider-Man film for Sony. Disney was reported to be co-financing 25% of the film in exchange for 25% of the film's profits, while retaining the merchandising rights to the character. The agreement also allowed Holland's Spider-Man to appear in a future Marvel Studios film, while Feige stated that moving forward the MCU's Spider-Man would be able to "cross cinematic universes" and appear in Sony's own shared universe as well. This interaction was said to be a call and answer' between the two franchises as they acknowledge details between the two in what would loosely be described as a shared detailed universe". Sony described their previous films with Marvel Studios as a "great collaboration", and said "our mutual desire to continue was equal to that of the many fans." Panitch acknowledged in May 2021 that there had been confusion and frustration from fans regarding the relationship between the two universes, but said there was a plan to clarify this and he believed it was already "getting a little more clear for people [as to] where we're headed" at that time. He added that the release of Spider-Man: No Way Home (2021) would reveal more of this plan.

In No Way Home, Doctor Strange casts two spells: one that brings characters from other universes into the MCU, and one that sends them back to their own universes. The mid-credits scene of Venom: Let There Be Carnage (2021) shows Venom being transported into the MCU from his universe by the first spell, and the mid-credits scene of No Way Home shows Venom being transported back to his own universe by the second spell. A small part of the Venom symbiote is left in the MCU. Feige said there was significant coordination between the Let There Be Carnage and No Way Home teams to create the two scenes, with No Way Home director Jon Watts directing both scenes during production of that film. In the mid-credits scenes of Morbius, taking place simultaneously with the events of No Way Home, Adrian Toomes / Vulture is revealed to have been transported to the SSU by the same spell, meeting with Morbius in an effort to form a team. In June 2022, Lord and Miller said that they intended for Sony's Spider-Man Universe and the animated Spider-Verse franchise to connect to the MCU via the multiverse.

Expansion to television 
Vinciquerra stated in March 2019 that the universe would be expanding to television with a set of Marvel projects developed specifically by Sony Pictures Television. At the time, the studio was "essentially internally auditioning" characters from the 900 it could access to decide which medium they would appear in, with Sony Pictures Television chairman Mike Hopkins describing their progress in selecting characters for television as "pretty far down the road". Hopkins elaborated that Sony planned to have several series set in the shared universe that could "pollinate between each other", and that they would be released by a yet-to-be-determined network partner. An announcement of this partner was expected within the next few months, with the networks owned by Marvel's parent Disney—including their new streaming service Disney+—being considered alongside others. These television plans were attributed to the success of Venom and Into the Spider-Verse, which "bolstered confidence that there's an appetite for Sony's slice of Marvel".

After their work on Into the Spider-Verse, Lord and Miller signed an overall deal with Sony Pictures Television in April 2019 to develop several television series for the studio, including their Marvel-based series, which could potentially include characters from Into the Spider-Verse as well as live-action properties. Select projects would be produced in conjunction with Pascal. Discussing these series in August, Miller could not update where or when the series would be released but said there would be several live-action series and they would each be a unique experience with connections to the others. The next month, Vinciquerra said there were five or six individual series in development for the universe. By January 2020, one of these series was believed to be a version of Silver & Black after development on that film was cancelled in August 2018. Gina Prince-Bythewood, who co-wrote and was going to direct the film version before it was cancelled, confirmed in April 2020 that Silver & Black was being re-developed for television. She suggested that it could be a limited series, and had the potential to be released on Disney+. That June, former Marvel Television and Marvel Studios television executive Karim Zreik was made head of television for Lord and Miller, putting him in charge of all their planned series including the Marvel-based ones. The latter were described as a priority for Sony Pictures Television, and Zreik's experience with previous Marvel television series made him a "suitable partner" for planning them.

By September 2020, Sony was in talks with Amazon Prime Video for the latter to be the streaming distributor for Sony's "suite" of Marvel-based television series, similar to Marvel Television's group of series that streamed on Netflix. The negotiations with Amazon were said to be complex, with "major issues that need to be resolved" due to the complicated distribution rights for the various characters. The series were expected to be released on a traditional television platform before moving to streaming. Amazon was confirmed at the end of April 2021 to have the rights to stream the upcoming series on Prime Video. In November 2022, the series were set to debut on the television network MGM+ before streaming on Prime Video. In February 2023, an untitled series centered on the character Spider-Man Noir was revealed to be in development.

Films

Released

Venom (2018) 

Following a scandal, journalist Eddie Brock attempts to revive his career by investigating the Life Foundation, but comes into contact with the alien symbiote Venom that bonds with Brock and gives him superpowers.

The long-in-development Venom film was revived by Sony in March 2016 as the start of the new shared universe. A year later, Scott Rosenberg and Jeff Pinkner were writing the screenplay. In May 2017, Sony announced that Tom Hardy would star as Eddie Brock / Venom in the film, to be directed by Ruben Fleischer. Kelly Marcel later joined as an additional writer. Filming took place from October 2017 to January 2018, in Atlanta, New York City, and San Francisco. Venom was released on October 5, 2018.

The producers wanted to focus on telling a standalone story with Venom, rather than having it introduce crossover opportunities for future films. However, the film does include a post-credits scene featuring a clip from Sony's Spider-Man: Into the Spider-Verse (2018) that reveals that Venom universe is part of the Spider-Verse, a shared multiverse. This was added because Sony and the producers of Venom were excited by the possibility of crossovers between the live-action and animated films after seeing the quality of Into the Spider-Verse.

Venom: Let There Be Carnage (2021) 

Eddie Brock continues to rebuild his career by interviewing serial killer Cletus Kasady, who becomes the host of the symbiote Carnage and escapes prison after a failed execution.

Woody Harrelson appeared as Cletus Kasady at the end of Venom as set-up for a potential sequel, which was confirmed in January 2019 when writer Marcel and star Hardy were confirmed to return. Fleischer did not return, due to commitments to Zombieland: Double Tap (2019); Andy Serkis was hired as director in August 2019. Filming took place in England from November 2019 to February 2020, with additional filming in San Francisco. Venom: Let There Be Carnage was released on October 1, 2021.

Serkis said Venom: Let There Be Carnage was set in its own world, with its characters unaware of other heroes such as Spider-Man, though the film does have some references to the wider Marvel Universe. These include the Daily Bugle newspaper, which has the same title treatment in the film as it did in Sam Raimi's Spider-Man film series. The mid-credits scene transports Brock and Venom to the Marvel Cinematic Universe due to the spell cast by Doctor Strange in Spider-Man: No Way Home (2021). Footage of Tom Holland as Peter Parker / Spider-Man and J. K. Simmons as J. Jonah Jameson from the MCU is shown in the scene.

Morbius (2022) 

Suffering from a rare blood disease, Michael Morbius tries a dangerous cure that afflicts him with a form of vampirism.

Following a "secret development process" at Sony, Matt Sazama and Burk Sharpless wrote a script for a film based on Morbius, the Living Vampire. By June 2018, Jared Leto was set to star as the title character, with Daniel Espinosa directing the film. Filming began at the end of February 2019, in London, and was confirmed to have completed by June. Morbius was released on April 1, 2022.

The mid-credits scenes of Morbius see Michael Keaton reprising his role as Adrian Toomes / Vulture from Spider-Man: Homecoming (2017), with the character being transported from the MCU to the SSU due to a spell cast by Doctor Strange in Spider-Man: No Way Home. Despite these connections, the producers intended to tell a standalone origin story for Morbius as they did with Venom.

Future

Kraven the Hunter (2023) 

Richard Wenk was hired to write a screenplay based on Kraven the Hunter in August 2018. Art Marcum and Matt Holloway had re-written the script by August 2020, and J. C. Chandor entered talks to direct; he was confirmed in May 2021 when Aaron Taylor-Johnson was cast in the title role. Filming began in late March 2022 in London, and concluded by mid-June. Kraven the Hunter is set to be released on October 6, 2023.

El Muerto (2024) 
After Sony executives were impressed by the performance of singer Bad Bunny in their film Bullet Train (2022) they became interested in having him star in another high-profile film. They settled on the minor Spider-Man-related character El Muerto, a wrestler who has superhuman strength, and looked to move quickly on the project. Bad Bunny made a "surprise appearance" at Sony's CinemaCon panel in April 2022 to announce the film. In October, Jonás Cuarón and Garreth Dunnet-Alcocer were hired to respectively direct and write the film. El Muerto is set to be released on January 12, 2024.

Madame Web (2024) 

After their work on Morbius, Sony hired Matt Sazama and Burk Sharpless in September 2019 to write a script centered around Madame Web. In May 2020, S. J. Clarkson was hired to develop and direct Sony's first female-centric Marvel film, which was reported to be the Madame Web film. The studio was looking to attach a prominent actress such as Charlize Theron or Amy Adams to the project, before hiring a new writer to craft the film with an actress in mind. By February 2022, Dakota Johnson was in talks to portray the lead character, and was confirmed to be starring that April. Filming began in mid-July, occurring in Boston and throughout Massachusetts until that September, before shooting in New York City by mid-October. Filming completed before the end of 2022. Madame Web is set to be released on February 16, 2024.

Untitled Venom: Let There Be Carnage sequel 
In August 2018, Hardy confirmed that he had signed on to star in three Venom films. Andy Serkis expressed interest in returning to direct another Venom film in September 2021, and that December, Pascal said they were in the "planning stages" of a third Venom film. Sony confirmed the film was in development at CinemaCon in April 2022. In June, Hardy revealed that Kelly Marcel was writing the script and that he was co-writing the story with her, and Marcel was set to direct that October.

Other films in development 
Sony has scheduled an unspecified film to release on July 12, 2024. The following is a list of known projects in development.

 The Sinister Six: Sony's December 2013 plans for their own The Amazing Spider-Man shared universe included a film based on the Sinister Six group of Spider-Man villains, with Drew Goddard attached to write. He was confirmed to also be directing the film in April 2014, but it was believed to have been cancelled by November 2015 when Sony was focusing on its new reboot with Marvel. Pascal said the film was "alive" again in December 2018 following the success of Venom, and she was waiting for Goddard to be ready to direct it before moving forward with the project.
 Nightwatch: By September 2017, Sony was actively developing a film based on the character Nightwatch, with a script from Edward Ricourt. Sony wanted Spike Lee to direct the film, and he was confirmed to be interested in the project in March 2018, with Cheo Hodari Coker re-writing the script. Lee was no longer involved by October.
 Jackpot: By August 2018, Sony was considering a film centered on the character Jackpot and was actively looking for a writer. Marc Guggenheim, a writer on the Jackpot comic books, was revealed to be writing the screenplay for Jackpot in May 2020, though he had been working on the film for two years already by that point.
 Untitled Roberto Orci project: In March 2020, Sony hired The Amazing Spider-Man 2 co-writer Roberto Orci to write the script for an untitled Marvel film that would be set in Sony's shared universe. The plot will be based on a property from a "different corner of the Marvel universe that Sony has access to" rather than a character affiliated with Spider-Man like Sony's other Marvel films.
 Untitled Olivia Wilde project: In August 2020, Olivia Wilde signed on to develop and direct a female-centric Marvel film for Sony with her writing partner Katie Silberman. The project had been a high priority at the studio since early 2020, and was believed to feature the character Spider-Woman.
 Untitled Hypno-Hustler film: In December 2022, Sony was revealed to be developing a film centered on the character Hypno-Hustler, with Donald Glover set to star and produce, and Myles Murphy set to write. Glover previously portrayed Aaron Davis in Spider-Man: Homecoming.
 Other projects: Sony was considering a film centered around Mysterio by June 2017, with Jake Gyllenhaal cast in the role for Far From Home. In December 2018, a spin-off film from the MCU Spider-Man films or the animated Spider-Verse films starring Spider-Man's Aunt May was suggested, a notion that Sony previously referred to as "silly".

Television series

Silk: Spider Society 
Cindy Moon escapes imprisonment after being bitten by a radioactive spider, and is in search of her missing family.

By the end of June 2018, Sony and Amy Pascal had begun development on a film centered on the character Cindy Moon / Silk portrayed by Tiffany Espensen in the Marvel Cinematic Universe, which would be distinct from the version appearing in Sony's animated Spider-Women film. In late 2019, Silk was identified as a good candidate for a television series, and development on the series version began with Pascal remaining as producer. In September 2020, Lauren Moon was writing and developing the series. In November 2022, the series was titled Silk: Spider Society, when Angela Kang joined to redevelop the series and serve as its showrunner and an executive producer alongside Pascal and the duo of Phil Lord and Christopher Miller.

Untitled Spider-Man Noir series 
In February 2023, it was revealed that a television series based on the Spider-Man Noir character was in development from Oren Uziel, who also was writing the series. Uziel, Pascal, and Lord and Miller would serve as executive producers.

Series in development 
Silver & Black: Sony cancelled its planned female team-up film Silver & Black in August 2018 with the intention of reworking it as two separate solo films focusing on each of the title characters—Felicia Hardy / Black Cat  and Silver Sable. Silver & Black director Gina Prince-Bythewood was expected to remain involved as a producer. By January 2020, the project was being re-developed as a television series, which Prince-Bythewood confirmed that April. She suggested that it could be a limited series.

Other media

Tie-in comic 
A comic book tie-in to Venom, serving as both a prequel and a teaser for the film, was released digitally by Marvel on September 14, 2018, with a physical version available to those who purchased tickets for the film from AMC Theatres. Written by Sean Ryan and illustrated by Szymon Kudranski, the comic establishes the film's backstory for the symbiote. SKAN provided the cover art for the comic.

Digital series 
In March 2022, Sony promoted Morbius with the third season of their promotional web series The Daily Bugle to TikTok, which had been previously used to promote Far From Home and No Way Home. The videos feature TikToker Nicque Marina as a fictionalized version of herself, reporting on events relative to the events of Morbius.

Cast and characters

Reception

Box office performance

Critical and public response

Accolades 
The franchise has been nominated for two Visual Effects Society Awards, among others.

Music

Soundtracks

Singles

See also 
 Spider-Man in film

References

External links 
 

 
Columbia Pictures franchises
Continuity (fiction)
Fictional universes
Film series based on Marvel Comics
Film series introduced in 2018
Marvel Comics dimensions
Marvel Entertainment franchises
Mass media franchises introduced in 2018
Mythopoeia
Science fiction franchises
Sony Pictures franchises
Spider-Man film series